Arytrura is a genus of moths of the family Noctuidae and only genus in the subtribe Arytrurina. The genus was erected by Oscar John in 1912.

Species
 Arytrura musculus (Ménétriés, 1859)
 Arytrura subfalcata (Ménétriés, 1859)

References

Catocalini